Fountain Publishers is a publishing company in Uganda and Rwanda. Fountain is a publisher of educational material, literary material and maps.

History
Fountain Publishers was started in 1988 by James Tumusiime and his wife. Its first offices were on top of the former City Bar. Fountain employed only four individuals, with just a typewriter and four desks. Their maiden publication was, "Who is Who in Uganda", a miniature directory of politicians, religious men and academicians. Uganda 30 years, 1992, their second imprint is telling too. It is a 30 year old nation birthday book.

Notable authors

Gilbert Bukenya
Mary Karooro Okurut
Goretti Kyomuhendo
Mahmood Mamdani
Janet Museveni
Christopher Henry Muwanga Barlow
Michael B. Nsimbi
Julius Ocwinyo
Charles Onyango-Obbo
Taban Lo Liyong
Lillian Tindyebwa
Timothy Wangusa

See also

 List of companies based in Uganda

References

External links 
 , the company's official website

1988 establishments in Uganda
Book publishing companies of Uganda
Educational publishing companies
Companies based in Kampala
Literary publishing companies
Publishing companies established in 1988
Kumusha